Kurofune ( kurofune, an Edo-period term meaning "black ships") is a 1940 Japanese-language western-style opera by Kosaku Yamada, which is regarded as the first Japanese opera.

External Links 

 Broadcast audio recording of the preface: Tokyo Philharmonic Orchestra conducted by Tadashi Mori, June 1968.

References

1940 operas
Compositions by Kosaku Yamada
Japanese-language operas
Operas